Burmakin is a surname. Notable people with the surname include:

Vladimir Burmakin (born 1967), Russian chess grandmaster
Dmitriy Burmakin (born 1981), Russian long-distance runner
 

Russian-language surnames